Reinhard Ritter (born 24 September 1948) is a German gymnast. He competed at the 1972 Summer Olympics and the 1976 Summer Olympics.

References

External links
 

1948 births
Living people
German male artistic gymnasts
Olympic gymnasts of West Germany
Gymnasts at the 1972 Summer Olympics
Gymnasts at the 1976 Summer Olympics
People from Bad Dürkheim (district)
Sportspeople from Rhineland-Palatinate